Kunthala Jayaraman, an Indian biotechnologist, is often regarded as the 'Mother of Industrial Biotechnology Education in the world'. Jayaraman, often referred to as Dr. KJ, is credited with establishing a harmonious balance among science, engineering, and technology at Anna University, in the field of industrial biotechnology. At the Indian Institute of Science in Bangalore, she earned a degree in biochemistry. She was also a distinguished faculty in the School of Biological Sciences (SBS) of the Madurai Kamaraj University (MKU). While at MKU, she was the instrumental to conduct the WHO Conference and International Training Programme. In MKU, she was mentored and inspired by S. Ramachandran, along with Kuppamuthu Dharmalingam, to write text books in biotechnology. In 2022, in the honour of Dr. Kunthala Jayaraman, The Academy of Sciences of Chennai conducted Kunthala Jayaraman Distinguished Lecture on “Disruptive reform in higher education and translational research” and it was delivered by Prof. Dr. P. Kaliraj, Professor of Eminence, Anna University and Former Vice-Chancellor, Bharathiar University, Coimbatore.

References 

Indian biotechnologists
Living people
Indian Institute of Science alumni